George Dobson Valentine (1852–1890) was a Scottish photographer.

The son of James Valentine, he became one of Scotland's leading photographers. Serious ill-health and the need for a warmer climate saw Valentine leave the family business and emigrate to New Zealand with his family in 1884. He continued with his career of photography and produced a significant body of work.

In 1885, he photographed the famous Pink and White Terraces and, after the destruction of the area by the Mount Tarawera eruption in 1886, photographed the area again creating a definitive record of this natural disaster. The Pink and White Terrace locations were finally mapped in 2017 after a lost 1859 survey was recovered and analysed.

He produced many of what were to become the classic iconic images of early New Zealand, including geyser studies in the thermal region and studies of New Zealand bush and waterfalls.

Valentine died in 1890, just six years after his arrival in New Zealand.

His work is represented in the Museum of New Zealand Te Papa Tongarewa and the Auckland Art Gallery.

Gallery

References

External links
Works by George D. Valentine in the collection of the Museum of New Zealand Te Papa Tongarewa

1852 births
1890 deaths
New Zealand photographers
Scottish photographers